General Navas Pardo Airport  is an airport serving the town of Chaparral in the Tolima Department of Colombia. The runway is on the east side of the town. There is mountainous terrain west through northeast of the airport, and rising terrain to the southwest and south.

See also

Transport in Colombia
List of airports in Colombia

References

External links
OurAirports - Chaparral
FallingRain - Chaparral Airport

Airports in Colombia